A list of Kannada language films produced in the Kannada film industry in India in the year 2020.

January–June

July - December

References

External links 
 Kannada Upcoming Releases

Lists of 2020 films by country or language
2020
2020 in Indian cinema